Brezovica is a village in the municipality of Trstenik, Serbia. According to the 2002 census, the village has a population of  636 people.

References

Populated places in Rasina District
Open-air museums in Serbia